"Magic Man" is a 1975 song by Heart.

Magic Man or The Magic Man may also refer to:

Arts and entertainment
 Magic Man (band), an American two-piece electronic band
 Magic Man (film), a 2010 film directed by Stuart Cooper
 "Magic Man" (Better Call Saul), a television episode
 The Magic Man, a 1974 Chicago musical that starred illusionist David Copperfield
 "Magic Man", a character in the Mega Man video-game franchise
 Magic Man (Jackson Wang album), 2022

People with the nickname
 Pavel Datsyuk (born 1978), Russian professional ice hockey player
 Paulie Malignaggi (born 1980), American retired professional boxer; also the title of a film about Malignaggi
 Kent Nilsson (born 1956), Swedish retired professional ice hockey player
 Andy Segal (born 1968), American trick-shot pool champion
 Jakub Moder (born 1999), Polish professional footballer